Mannford is a city in Creek County in the northeastern part of the U.S. state of Oklahoma. In 2010, the population was 3,076, up from 2,095 at the 2000 census. The city sits next to Keystone Lake and claims to be the "Striped Bass Capital of the World".

History
The town name is derived from "Mann's Ford", a crossing of the Cimarron River where Tom and Hazel Mann had received a Creek allotment. The Arkansas Valley and Western Railroad (later the St. Louis and San Francisco Railroad (commonly called "Frisco") built a line through this area in 1902–03, making it an important cattle shipping point. A post office was established April 11, 1903.

When the Army Corps of Engineers began making plans for flood control that would flood the town of Mannford, citizens formed a plan to relocate several miles southeast of the original site. The move was completed in 1963.

On August 3, 2012, a wildfire started several miles south of Mannford. Carried by strong south winds and extremely dry vegetation, the fire pushed up into the Mannford area and caused evacuations of the town.

Geography
It is situated on both sides of a southwest arm of Keystone Lake, a reservoir on the Arkansas and Cimarron rivers. Most of the developed part of the town is on the west side of the lake arm, which fills the valley of Salt Creek.

Demographics
As of the census of 2000, there were 2,095 people, 783 households, and 583 families residing in the town. The population density was 389.8 people per square mile (150.6/km). There were 865 housing units at an average density of 160.9 per square mile (62.2/km). The racial makeup of the town was 91.31% White, 0.10% African American, 4.39% Native American, 0.24% Asian, 0.24% Pacific Islander, 0.29% from other races, and 3.44% from two or more races. Hispanic or Latino of any race were 1.43% of the population.

There were 783 households, out of which 38.3% had children under the age of 18 living with them, 58.5% were married couples living together, 11.7% had a female householder with no husband present, and 25.5% were non-families. 23.1% of all households were made up of individuals, and 10.9% had someone living alone who was 65 years of age or older. The average household size was 2.57 and the average family size was 3.45.

In the town the population was spread out, with 28.4% under the age of 18, 7.2% from 18 to 24, 28.2% from 25 to 44, 22.0% from 45 to 64, and 14.3% who were 65 years of age or older. The median age was 36 years. For every 100 females, there were 89.8 males. For every 100 females age 18 and over, there were 85.5 males.

The median income for a household in the town was $34,306, and the median income for a family was $41,750. Males had a median income of $32,991 versus $20,625 for females. The per capita income for the town was $17,722. About 6.5% of families and 8.5% of the population were below the poverty line, including 6.5% of those under age 18 and 13.2% of those age 65 or over.

About 99 percent of the employed residents commuted to work in Sand Springs and Tulsa during 2000.

The town currently has nineteen churches.

Economy
In 2012, the city of Mannford contracted with Rickey Hayes of Retail Attractions to provide economic development consulting, due to retail leakage to surrounding communities. A marina, a floating restaurant, improved campgrounds, new housing and expanded industrial and commercial venues are currently all in development. Mannford's largest employer is the public school system followed by Webco Industries, and Care Fusion.

Education
The Mannford school district has five schools that include an Early Childhood Center, two elementary schools, a middle school, and a high school, and serves 1,486 students. Mannford High School offers a variety of extracurricular activities. These activities include speech and debate, band, academic team, FFA and many other extracurricular programs.

Media
Mannford had one newspaper, The Mannford Reporter, which is no longer in regular circulation. The paper was a free paper published every other Wednesday. It is owned by CL Harmon. In the December 7, 2011 the Eagle, the previous newspaper, announced that it was "merging" with the Sand Springs Leader (owned by Community Publishers) and no longer delivering a Mannford Eagle paper. This is when CL Harmon stepped in and started providing The Mannford Reporter.

Notable person
 Lee Hazlewood, country and pop singer, songwriter, and record producer, was born here.

References

External links
 

Cities in Creek County, Oklahoma
Cities in Oklahoma
Tulsa metropolitan area
Oklahoma populated places on the Arkansas River